A tangent, in geometry, is a straight line through a point on a curve that has the same direction at that point as the curve.

Tangent may also refer to:

Mathematics 
Analogous concepts for surfaces and higher-dimensional smooth manifolds, such as the tangent space
More generally, in geometry, two curves are said to be tangent when they intersect at a given point and have the same direction at that point; see for instance tangent circles
Bitangent, a line that is tangent to two different curves, or tangent twice to the same curve
The tangent function, one of the six basic trigonometric functions

Music 
Tangent (clavichord), a part of the action of the clavichord that both initiates and sustains a tone, and helps determine pitch
Tangent (tangent piano), a part of the action of the tangent piano that only initiates the sound by striking the string(s) and rebounding immediately in the manner of a piano
The Tangent, an international progressive rock supergroup
Tangents: The Tea Party Collection, a compilation album from The Tea Party released in 2000.
Tangents: 1973–1983, a compilation box set from Tangerine Dream released in 1994.
Tangents (band), an Australian musical group

Entertainment 
Tangent Comics, a short-lived imprint of DC Comics
"The Tangent Universe", the alternate universe in time travel in the cult film Donnie Darko
Tangent (Stargate SG-1), an episode of the television series Stargate SG-1
Tangents (film) or Time Chasers, a 1994 science fiction film
Tangents (collection), a collection of science fiction stories by Greg Bear

Geography 
 Tangent, Alberta, a hamlet in Alberta, Canada
 Tangent, Oregon, a city in Linn County, Oregon, United States
 The Tangent Line, part of the Mason-Dixon line between Delaware and Maryland, United States
Tangente River, a tributary of the Wawagosic River, in Quebec, Canada

Other uses 
 Tangent (club), an international social networking group for women over 45, part of the Round Table family
 Track transition curve, a straight section of road or track in highway and railroad design

Mathematics disambiguation pages